William Chilton  may refer to:

 William Chilton (printer) (1815–1855), printer, Owenite Socialist, atheist, evolutionist, and co-founder of The Oracle of Reason
 William E. Chilton (1858–1939), United States Senator
 William Parish Chilton (1810–1871), Alabama lawyer, jurist and politician